Dragutinović is a Serbian patronymic surname derived from a masculine given name Dragutin. Notable people with the surname include:

Branko Dragutinović, football player
Diana Dragutinović, Minister of Finance in the Government of Serbia
Dragan Dragutinović, Serbian  footballer
Ivica Dragutinović, Serbian footballer
Nikola Dragutinović, actor
Vladimir Dragutinović, Serbian basketball player

See also 
 Dragutin

Serbian surnames
Patronymic surnames